An annular solar eclipse occurred on April 19, 1958. A solar eclipse occurs when the Moon passes between Earth and the Sun, thereby totally or partly obscuring the image of the Sun for a viewer on Earth. An annular solar eclipse occurs when the Moon's apparent diameter is smaller than the Sun's, blocking most of the Sun's light and causing the Sun to look like an annulus (ring). An annular eclipse appears as a partial eclipse over a region of the Earth thousands of kilometres wide. Annularity was visible in the Maldives, Nicobar Islands, Burma, Thailand including the capital city Bangkok, Cambodia, Laos, North Vietnam and South Vietnam (now belonging to Vietnam), China, British Hong Kong, Taiwan, Ryukyu Islands and Japan. It was the fourth central solar eclipse visible from Bangkok from 1948 to 1958, where it is rare for a large city to witness 4 central solar eclipses in just 9.945 years. Places east of International Date line witnessed the eclipse on April 18th (Friday).

Observation 
Compared with a total solar eclipse, the chromosphere, corona and solar prominence are invisible during an annular eclipse. However, observations of millimeter-wave solar radio can provide data for lower- and mid-layer structure of the chromosphere, which is more valuable during an annular solar eclipse.

China 
A joint observation team formed by the Academy of Sciences of the Soviet Union (predecessor of today's Russian Academy of Sciences) and the Chinese Academy of Sciences conducted 8-millimeter radio observation in Sanya, Hainan Island, China using the equatorial parabolic radio telescope manufactured by the Lebedev Physical Institute and the dual-channel radiometer as a receiver. Radio astronomy started to develop from then in China. Due to the Sino-Soviet split soon after this eclipse, the two countries did not conduct any joint observations of the total solar eclipse of September 22, 1968. On January 23, 1969, the People's Daily published an article reporting the observation of the eclipse in 1968, where it also criticized that the Soviet Union "plundered data of the annular solar eclipse" in 1958, only left China a "worn radio telescope antenna", and later even asked for it back.

Japan 
Observation ships were sent to Hachijō-jima, Izu Islands, Japan. Pictures were also taken in Tanegashima, Osumi Islands, and luminosity, air pressure, temperature, humidity, water temperature of the storage tank, ground temperature, wind direction, wind speed and other data were recorded every 10 minutes.

Related eclipses

Solar eclipses of 1957–1960

Saros 128

Tritos series

Metonic series

Notes

References

 Russia expedition for solar eclipse of April 19, 1958

1958 4 19
1958 in science
1958 4 19
April 1958 events